The Battle of Gurin took place on 29 April 1915 during the Kamerun campaign of World War I in Gurin, British Nigeria near the border with German Kamerun. The battle was one of the largest of the German forays into the British colony. It ended in a successful British repulsion of the German force.

Background
By April 1915, British forces were concentrated mainly in southern and central Kamerun, leaving much of the Nigerian border with the German colony relatively undefended. Following the failed siege of the main German outpost in northwestern Kamerun at the First Battle of Garua in August 1914, German forces in the area had substantial freedom of movement. This allowed Captain von Crailsheim, the German commander at Garua, to conduct a number of raids into British Nigeria. In late April, a force commanded by von Crailsheim joined with a smaller one commanded by Captain Schipper to attack the village of Gurin, just inside the Nigerian border.

The village of Gurin was protected by one circular fort and a garrison of 42 men consisting mostly of policemen commanded by Captain Derek Pawle.

Battle
At daybreak on 29 April 1915, the German force surrounded and attacked the fort at Gurin. Early in the battle, the British commander Captain Pawle was killed in action, leaving Lieutenant Joseph F. J. Fitzpatrick to lead the defense of the fort. The Germans brought up five machine guns, which were able to damage the fort's defenses. Despite superiority in both manpower and weapons, the Germans did not succeed in capturing the fort at Gurin. At around midday, after seven hours of fighting, von Crailsheim and his force withdrew from Gurin. The British lost 13 men or approximately 30% of their force through the battle. The German unit lost 40 African and 5 European soldiers.

Aftermath
After the battle, Captain Schipper took wounded German troops southwards while von Crailsheim lead the rest back to Garua. British forces attempted to intercept the returning German units but failed. The engagement was technically a failure for the Germans but von Crailsheim did succeed in inflicting significant casualties on the force at Garin and surprising British military leadership by penetrating the border.

The action that took place at Gurin made the Allied commander in western Kamerun, Colonel Cunliffe, uneasy about the freedom of movement that the German force stationed at Garua had. The garrison there had not been seriously engaged by Allied forces since the First Battle of Garua in August 1914. The battle at Garin set into motion another British and French attempt to finally take the German forts at Garua. Ultimately, this conflict resulted in a successful defense of Gurin and the Second Battle of Garua.

Notes

References
Baxter, Peter. The Fight at Gurin, The Cameroon Campaign 29 April 1915. Peter Baxter Africa RSS, 25 Feb. 2011. Web. 28 Dec. 2012.
Hogan, Edmund M. Berengario Cermenati among the Igbirra (Ebira) of Nigeria: A Study in Colonial, Missionary and Local Politics, 1897-1925.Ibadan, Nigeria: HEBN, 2011.
Bryce, James B., Holland Thomson, and William M.F. Petrie. The Book of History: The Causes of the War. The Events of 1914-1915. Vol. 16: Grolier Society, 1920.
Wood, Leonard, Austin M. Knight, Frederick Palmer, Frank H. Simonds, and Arthur B. Ruhl. The Story of the Great War: With Complete Historical Record of Events to Date. Ed. Francis J. Reynolds, Allen L. Churchill, and Francis T. Miller. Vol. 6: P.F. Collier & Sons, 1916.

Battles of World War I involving Germany
Battles of World War I involving the United Kingdom
History of Nigeria
1915 in Africa
African theatre of World War I
Battles of the African Theatre (World War I)
Military history of Nigeria
Military history of Cameroon
Battles of the Kamerun campaign
April 1915 events
1915 in Nigeria
Nigeria in World War I